Ivo Křen (6 February 1964 – 9 May 2020) was a Czech graphic artist, art glass theoretician and curator.

Life 
After graduating from grammar school in Pardubice (1979–82) Ivo Křen studied art education and Czech language at the Faculty of Pedagogics, University of Hradec Králové, under Prof. Bořivoj Borovský. He briefly worked as a teacher and then worked at the East Bohemian Gallery and since 1989 at the East Bohemian Museum in Pardubice.

He was a member of the Association of Czech Graphic Artists Hollar, the Rubikon art group and the Academy of Design of the Czech Republic. He has exhibited independently since 1991 and presented his graphic works at many joint exhibitions around the world.

He was associated with the graphic artists of the middle generation of the Association of Czech Graphic Artists HOLLAR in Prague and received awards for his work using a multi-coloured linocut technique.

As the organizer of the permanent exhibition Czech Glass of the 20th Century and curator of the art and industrial collections of the East Bohemian Museum in Pardubice (1992), he managed the collection of studio glass. He worked as an art glass theoretician. Ivo Křen was a founding member, curator of exhibitions and author of texts of Rubikon Group (1998), a group of prominent Czech glassmakers. With the Rubikon group, he has presented his work in Germany, Austria, Iceland, France, Belgium and Italy.

Ivo Křen lived and worked in Pardubice. He died on 9 May 2020 at the age of 56.

Work 
Ivo Křen's graphic work specialised in the linocut technique, which since 2008 he sometimes combined with a monotype base. His first linocuts (1988) were illustrations for Vladimír Holan's poetic composition A Night with Hamlet, where in his figurative compositions he made use of raw unpolishedness, hatching, dramatic contrast of black and white lines and massive dark surfaces.

However, he soon began to explore the technical possibilities of this graphic technique - from the illusion of volume by engraved lines and textures, through flat and monochromatic shapes, to the possibility of creating pasty chiaroscuro layers in print with subsurface transparencies of colour that emerge from the surface as a perceptible relief element. He mastered the technique of multi-coloured linocut, where colour is a carrier of meaning and part of the expression of all sensory perceptions and emotional connections. Linocut allows him a sweeping gesture of colour and the alternation of surfaces with minute details of structures, blending monumentality with fragility.

The lengthy process of engraving on a large format matrix allows for a contemplative approach to the work and a continuous transformation of the original motif in the creative process as well as an exploration of new technical possibilities of expression.

In the early 1990s, with the transition to multi-coloured prints, his interest gradually shifted from figurative work to natural compositions of rocks, walls and labyrinths or interior details, where he explored the possibilities of perspective and image depth or the effect of lights and shadows. The compositions are generously conceived, devoid of details, with a clear emotional charge.

The second half of the 1990s is characterised by a painterly approach to reality, flat expressive colour and fine details, the combination of many hues of a single colour in the resulting juxtaposition and a transition to abstracted forms.

A frequent motif is the intimate recesses of gardens, in a figurative sense the recesses of the soul, the mystery of the unknowable and an expression of the subjective search for balance and order.

As a graphic designer Ivo Křen was involved in the creation of posters and typographic design of book publications of the Rubikon Group and some small occasional prints.

Quote 
"It's worth  to me to be amazed and be charmed by trivia. To seek, to observe, to surprise and to entertain myself. To enjoy the fact that many things, formerly completely overlooked in the headlong rush for the ever new and strange, still remain ready to be discovered."

Representation in collections 

 State Museum, Majdanek, Poland
 Cremona Civic Museum – Prints Cabinet, Cremona, Italy
 Museum Narodowe, Warsaw, Poland
 National Museum, Kraków, Poland
 Stadt Weiden, Regionalbibliothek, Weiden, Germany
 Schio Municipal Collection, Schio, Italy
 Ministry of Foreign Affairs of the Czech Republic, Prague
 Gallery Klatovy – Klenová
 Regional Gallery Liberec
 Art Gallery Karlovy Vary
 East Bohemian Gallery in Pardubice
 Forbo linoleum BV, Prague
 Town Museum and Gallery Polička
 Municipal Library in Prague
 Cabinet Ex libris, Chrudim

Gallery

References

Sources

Author's catalogues 
 Ivo Křen: Grafika / Prints, text B. Vachudová, Gallery of the University of Pardubice 2016-2017
 Ivo Křen: Linocuts, 2014, B. Vachudová, GU Karlovy Vary, graphic design by P. Vlček, cat. 60 p., 200 copies, printed by the author, ISBN 978-80-260-6975-1
 Ivo Křen : Carpe diem (linocuts), 2011, Kroupová M, OGL, GUKV, graphic design by P. Vlček, cat. 69 p., 250 copies, printed by the author, Pardubice, ISBN 978-80-260-0250-5

Curator texts 
 Ivo Křen: Czech glass: studio glassmaking : permanent exhibition, 2006, 80 p., East Bohemian Museum in Pardubice, ISBN 80-86046-91-5
 Ivo Křen: České sklo: collection of studio glass art and design of the East Bohemian Museum in Pardubice, 2016, 160 p., East Bohemian Museum in Pardubice, ISBN 978-80-87151-42-6

Catalogues and publications 
 Rubikon, Katalog zur Jubiläumsausstellung 30+10=40 Jahre Glasmuseum Frauenau, tx. tx., graphic design by Křen I., cat. 68 p., Glasmuseum Frauenau
 Bohumil Eliáš Jr., Glass, paintings, 2013, tx., graph. ed. Křen. I., cat. 80 p., courtesy of the author
 Convergence J.Žertová, Vl. Kopecký, 2013, tx., graphic arrangement Křen I, cat. 28 p., VČG and VČM in Pardubice, ISBN 978-80-85112-74-0
 Bohumil Eliáš jr, Glass, painting, 2013, Křen I, author's catalogue, courtesy of the author
 Tomáš Hlavička, glass 1997-2009, 2010, Křen I, aut. catalogue, courtesy of the author
 Bohumil Eliáš, 2009, Křen I, monogr. 280 p., Aspekt Gallery, Brno
 Rubikon Group, 2008, Křen I, cat. for the exhibition in KGVU in Zlín, published by Rubikon Group
 Rubikon group 2003: Eliáš, Matouš, Exnar, Rybák, Křen, 2003, tx., graphic arrangement Křen I, cat. 85 p., Eng., Fr., German, Rubikon, Prague, ISBN 80-239-0458-2
 Jaromír Rybák - Creatures from the bestiary, 2001, Křen I, cat. 40 p., no., English, VČM Pardubice, published by the author, ISBN 80-86046-51-6
 Rubicon: Eliáš, Exnar, Rybák, Matouš, 1998, Křen I, cat. 40 p., VČM Pardubice, ISBN 80-85112-21-3

External links 

 Ivo Křen in the abART information system
 Ivo Křen, SČUG Hollar
 Dana Zikmundová, Enjoy the day like Ivo Křen, Artalk, 2011
 Ivo Křen, Grapheion, 2012
 Marie Kohoutová, interview with Ivo Křen, Glassrevue (2002), Journey to the Center of the Earth, interview Archived June 13, 2020 at the Wayback Machine

1964 births
2020 deaths
People from Pardubice
Czech printmakers
Czech artists
Czech curators
European art curators
Czech art historians